John P. Devine (January 22, 1878 – October 21, 1955) was an American politician.

Biography
Born in Harmon, Illinois, Devine received his law degree from Dixon College and then practiced law in Dixon, Illinois. He was a Democrat. He served in the Illinois House of Representatives from 1913 to 1935 and was Speaker of the Illinois House of Representatives in 1935. He then returned to Dixon, Illinois to practice law. Devine was a referee for the United States District Court for the Northern District of Illinois. He died in 1955 in Dixon, Illinois.

References

1878 births
1955 deaths
People from Dixon, Illinois
Illinois lawyers
Speakers of the Illinois House of Representatives
Democratic Party members of the Illinois House of Representatives